Michel-Joseph Bourguignon d'Herbigny (8 May 1880 – 23 December 1957) was a French Jesuit scholar and Roman Catholic bishop. He was president of the Pontifical Oriental Institute in Rome, and of the Pontifical Commission for Russia. He was secretly consecrated a bishop and was instrumental in a failed attempt to establish a clandestine hierarchy for the Catholic Church in the Soviet Union during the religious persecutions of the 1920s.

Early life
D'Herbigny was born in Lille, in northern France. He entered the Jesuit order at the age of seventeen, and studied in Paris, and in Trier in Germany. He was ordained priest on 23 August 1910. In 1911 his thesis on the Russian religious philosopher Vladimir Solovyov was published as Vladimir Soloviev: A Russian Newman, and was awarded a prize by the Académie Française. Because of this, he was noticed and investigated by the Sodalitium Pianum.  Having become known as the leading Jesuit Russian scholar, d'Herbigny was assigned to a teaching post in Rome in 1921. He was appointed president of the Pontifical Oriental Institute in 1922. He was appointed president of the Pontifical Commission for Russia in 1926.

Secret mission to the USSR
By 1926 the level of religious persecution in the Soviet Union was such that the entire leadership of the Catholic Church in that country had effectively been eliminated by exile or imprisonment. Pope Pius XI took the decision to attempt the establishment of a provisional hierarchy without the knowledge, still less the approval, of the Soviet government. The Pope's plans were set down in the rescript Plenitudine Potestatis and the decree Quo aptius, and involved the establishment of Apostolic Administrators in metropolitan centres, to replace the diocesan structures that had existed in Tsarist times.

D'Herbigny was selected as the man to lead this attempt, and on 26 March 1926, en route to Moscow under the pretext of an Easter pastoral visit to western European Catholics resident in the Soviet capital, he received episcopal ordination in secret and behind closed doors from Eugenio Pacelli (the future Pope Pius XII), the Papal Nuncio in Berlin.

In Moscow, d'Herbigny conferred episcopal orders on Pie Eugène Neveu, A.A., until then the pastor of the Catholic community in the mining town of Makiivka in Ukraine, and installed him as pastor of the church of St. Louis des Français in Moscow, with the clandestine role of Apostolic Administrator for the Catholic Church in the Moscow region (of the historic archdiocese of Mogilev). Later in the same tour, d'Herbigny also consecrated Aleksander Frison and Boļeslavs Sloskāns and appointed them to similar roles, in Odessa and Mogilev respectively. He also consecrated Antoni Malecki and appointed him to a similar role in Leningrad. Further missions to the Soviet Union, and further appointments, followed.

At the end of 1932, d'Herbigny was seriously compromised by the scandal created by Alexander Deubner, Russian priest and nephew of Clara Zetkin, the famous Communist and one of Moscow's international agents. D'Herbigny had hired him as a translator, and this unbalanced priest was even officially the co-author of the last book that he had just published. Having left precipitously in November 1932 for Berlin, for reasons that were not very honourable, Deubner was denounced as a Soviet spy.

Downfall and isolation
Within little more than a decade, all those appointed in secret by Bishop d'Herbigny had been imprisoned, exiled or executed, and the Vatican's policy of attempting to organise the church in Russia by means of clandestine appointments was abandoned. D'Herbigny was stripped of his powers and silenced, in circumstances which historians have not been able to clarify. French papal historian Yves Chiron gives a number of possible reasons: an internal settlement of affairs within the Jesuit order; jealousy of his privileged relations with Pius XI on the part of his Polish Jesuit superior general, Wlodimir Ledóchowski; an affair with a woman; Russian provocation in revenge for his antics; general failure of his policies and tactics.

In 1937, d'Herbigny was forced to abdicate his episcopal dignities and forbidden from any public activity whatsoever.

Episcopal title
D'Herbigny was appointed titular bishop of Ilium by Pope Pius XI in 1926. Ilium is Latin for Troy; D'Herbigny's mission to the USSR has been likened to the story of the Trojan Horse.

See also
 Edmund A. Walsh

Notes

References

 Alvarez, David, Spies in the Vatican: Espionage & Intrigue from Napoleon to the Holocaust, University Press of Kansas, Lawrence KA, 2002 
 Barthel, Manfred, The Jesuits: History and Legend of the Society of Jesus. William Morrow, New York NY, 1984 
 Chiron, Yves, Pie XI: 1857-1939, Perrin, Paris, 2004 
 Fouilloux, Etienne, Les Catholiques et l'Unité Chrétienne du XIXe au XXe Siècle, Le Centurion, Paris, 1982 
 of Mary of the Angels, Francis, "Pius XI's Politics: A Theodemocratic Pope", He Is Risen, 16, December 2003
 Lesourd, Paul, Entre Rome et Moscou: Le Jésuite Clandestin, Mgr d'Herbigny, P. Lethielleux, Paris, 1976 
 McVay, Athanasius and Lubomyr Y. Luciuk, "The Holy See and the Holodomor: Documents from the Vatican Secret Archives on the Great Famine of 1932-1933 in Soviet Ukraine," Kashtan Press, Kingston, Ontario, 2011
 Mitchell, David, The Jesuits: A History, Macdonald Futura, London, 1980 
 O'Grady, Desmond, The Turned Card: Christianity Before and After the Wall, Loyola Press, Kaukauna WI, 1997 
 Reichelt, Stefan G.: Michel d'Herbigny S.J. In: Nikolaj A. Berdjaev in Deutschland 1920-1950. Eine rezeptionshistorische Studie. Universitätsverlag, Leipzig 1999, 147-149, 
 Stehle, Hansjakob, The Eastern Politics of the Vatican, 1917-1979, Ohio University Press, Athens OH, 1981 
 Tretjakewitsch, Léon, Bishop Michel d'Herbigny SJ and Russia: A Pre-Ecumenical Approach to Christian Unity, Augustinus Verlag, Würzburg, 1990 
 Weigel, George, The Final Revolution: The Resistance Church and the Collapse of Communism, Oxford University Press US, Cary NC, 2003 
 
 Wenger, Antoine, Catholiques en Russie d'Après les Archives du KGB: 1920-1960, Desclée de Brouwer, Paris, 1998 
 Wenger, Antoine, Rome et Moscou: 1900-1950, Desclée de Brouwer, Paris, 1987 
 Zugger, Christopher Lawrence, The Forgotten: Catholics of the Soviet Empire from Lenin Through Stalin, Syracuse University Press, Syracuse NY, 2001 

French Jesuits
Roman Catholic bishops in the Soviet Union
1880 births
1957 deaths
French Roman Catholic titular bishops